is a former Japanese football player. He played for Japan national team.

Club career
Nakamura was born in Funabashi on January 27, 1979. After graduating from Nihon University, he joined Nagoya Grampus Eight (later Nagoya Grampus) in 2001. He became a regular player in 2002. Although he was originally offensive midfielder, he also played many matches as defensive midfielder and right side midfielder. From 2008, he played as defensive midfielder under new manager Dragan Stojković. The club won the 3rd place 2008 J1 League and the 2nd place 2009 Emperor's Cup. In 2010, the club won the champions 2010 J1 League their first league champions. In 2011, the club also won the 2nd place J1 League. From 2012, his opportunity to play decreased and he retired end of 2014 season.

National team career
Nakamura's only appearance for Japan came on August 9, 2006, in a friendly against Trinidad and Tobago.

Club Statistics

National team statistics

Honours
Nagoya Grampus
 J1 League (1): 2010
 Japanese Super Cup (1): 2011

References

External links
 
Japan National Football Team Database

1979 births
Living people
Nihon University alumni
Association football people from Chiba Prefecture
Japanese footballers
Japan international footballers
J1 League players
Nagoya Grampus players
Association football midfielders